The Matt Ruatsale Homestead in Valley County, Idaho, in the vicinity of Lake Fork, Idaho, was built in c.1915. The house was moved to its present location from the Ruatsale homestead site sometime prior to it being listed on the National Register of Historic Places in 1982.

It is partitioned into four rooms. The east–west partition protrudes through exterior walls in traditional Finnish style.

References

Houses on the National Register of Historic Places in Idaho
Houses completed in 1915
Valley County, Idaho
Log houses
Finnish-American culture in Idaho
Finnish-American history